Grotki  is a village in the administrative district of Gmina Radzanów, within Białobrzegi County, Masovian Voivodeship, in east-central Poland.

The village has a population of 160.

References

Grotki